Clarence Campbell House, also known as "Hillcrest," is a historic home and farm located near Union, Monroe County, West Virginia.  It was built in 1907, and is a large -story, three bay, frame dwelling in the Queen Anne style. The house is covered in clapboard painted white.  It features a two-story rounded tower on the southwestern corner and wraparound verandah.  Also on the property is a children's playground (c. 1920), garage and shop (c. 1910), cattle barn (c. 1910), and storage barn (c. 1910).

It was listed on the National Register of Historic Places in 1995.

References

Houses on the National Register of Historic Places in West Virginia
Queen Anne architecture in West Virginia
Houses completed in 1907
Houses in Monroe County, West Virginia
National Register of Historic Places in Monroe County, West Virginia
Farms on the National Register of Historic Places in West Virginia